Lebanon competed at the 1988 Summer Olympics in Seoul, South Korea. 21 competitors, 19 men and 2 women, took part in 28 events in 8 sports.

Competitors
The following is the list of number of competitors in the Games.

Athletics

Men

Track events

Women

Track events

Boxing

Cycling

Road

Men

Fencing

Men

Judo

Men

Swimming

Men

Women

Weightlifting

Men

Wrestling

Men's Greco-Roman

References

External links
Official Olympic Reports

Nations at the 1988 Summer Olympics
1988
1988 in Lebanese sport